Habibpur is a village in the Habibpur CD block in the Malda Sadar subdivision of Malda district in the state of West Bengal, India.

Geography

Location

Area overview
The area shown in the adjacent map covers two physiographic regions – the Barind in the east and the tal in the west. The eastern part is comparatively high (up to 40 metres above mean sea level at places) and uneven. The soils of the eastern region are “hard salty clays of a reddish hue and the ground is baked hard as iron.” It lies to the east of the Mahananda River. The area lying to the west of the Mahananda River, the tal, is a flat low land and “is strewn with innumerable marshes, bils and oxbow lakes.” The tal area is prone to flooding by local rivers. The total area is overwhelmingly rural. There are two important historical/ archaeological sites in the area – Pandua and Jagjivanpur.

Note: The map alongside presents some of the notable locations in the area. All places marked in the map are linked in the larger full screen map.

Civic administration

Police station
Habibpur police station under West Bengal police has jurisdiction over Habibpur CD block.

CD block HQ
The headquarters of Habibpur CD block is at Habibpur.

Demographics
As per the 2011 Census of India, Habibpur had a total population of 2,576, of which 1,276 (50%) were males and 1,300 (50%) were females. Population below 6 years was 327. The total number of literates in Habibpur was 1,327 (59.00% of the population over 6 years).

Transport
Local roads passing through Kachu Pukur and Aiho link Habibpur to National Highway 12 (old number NH 34) at Malda.

References

Villages in Malda district